Mark Fuller may refer to:
 Mark Fuller (judge), American judge in Alabama
 Mark W. Fuller, president and founder of WET Design
 Mark Fuller (wrestler) (born 1961), American amateur wrestler
 Mark Fuller (squash player) (born 1985), English squash player
 Mark B. Fuller, American businessman and academic
 Mark Fuller, musician in Thinking Plague